is a sports video game developed by Intelligent Systems and published by Nintendo for the Nintendo Entertainment System. It was released in Japan and North America in 1985, and in Europe in 1987. It was released for the Famicom Disk System in 1986. It was released on the Wii and Wii U Virtual Console on June 12, 2014. It was released on Nintendo Switch Online in 2018.

Gameplay
As with real soccer, the objective is to kick the ball into the opponent's goal. The game features cheerleaders and the option of 15, 30, and 45-minutes halves. Pressing B passes the ball, and A shoots at the opponent's goal.

Seven teams are represented: USA, Great Britain, France, West Germany, Brazil, Japan, and Spain.

When beginning a game, the player chooses whether to play with one or two players. The single-player mode is against the computer with five variable difficulty settings. The player chooses between seven teams and sets a time limit of either 15-, 30-, or 45-minute halves. Games begin in the center of a horizontal field, which pans from side to side with player activity. The player closest to the ball controls it and can kick the ball at the push of a button. An indicator over the closest teammate headed in the same direction as the player indicates who can receive a pass. Goal shots can be controlled with a small meter that represents the ball reaching over the goalie's head. Likewise, the player automatically controls the goalie when the opponent makes a goal shot.

Reception 
In Japan, Game Machine listed Vs. Soccer in its February 1, 1986, issue as being the nineteenth most-successful table arcade unit of the month. Computer and Video Games said that though every console receives a soccer game, Nintendo's was among the best. They noted the game was somewhat slow and not very attractive, with sparse backgrounds and formless players, but that did not affect the fun. The magazine rated the game 83% overall, with 8/10 for playability and 6/10 for graphics and sound.

See also
List of association football video games

Notes

References

External links

1985 video games
Famicom Disk System games
Association football video games
Intelligent Systems games
Nintendo Entertainment System games
Virtual Console games
Virtual Console games for Wii U
Multiplayer and single-player video games
Video games developed in Japan
Video games scored by Koji Kondo
Nintendo games
Nintendo Switch Online games
Nintendo Switch games
Hamster Corporation games